The AutoTram Extra Grand are a series of bi-articulated passenger buses. They are over 30 metres (100 feet) long and have a maximum capacity of 256 passengers, making them the largest passenger buses in the world as of 2022 in service.

Operations and specifications

The AutoTram Extra Grand was unveiled in Dresden, Germany, in August 2012.

See also
Volvo Gran Artic 300
Van Hool AGG300
Bi-articulated bus
Bus rapid transit
Public transport

References

External links
autotram.info website

Buses of Germany
Low-floor buses
Bi-articulated buses
Public transport